Crimecall is a television show broadcast once monthly on RTÉ. It is co-produced in Dublin, Ireland by Green Ink Ltd and 360 Production South Ltd. Since January 2018, the show is presented by Sharon Ní Bheoláin. It is a second RTÉ adaptation of German crime programme Aktenzeichen XY… ungelöst, and its format matches that of its British derivative Crimewatch and re-enacts unsolved crimes.

The Garda Bureau of Community Engagement is responsible for Crimecall.

History 
On 28 October 1964, RTÉ began broadcasting Garda Patrol, a fifteen-minute weekly television show seeking public assistance in solving crimes. The show was later revamped in 1992 (this was closely modelled on BBC's Crimewatch UK), and retitled Crimeline. Broadcast once a month, it was originally presented by David Harvey and Marian Finucane and produced by Midas Productions. Following Finucane's departure in November 2000, she was replaced by Anne Doyle in January 2001. This version of the show was axed in October 2003 after eleven years on air. Since September 2004, the show has been known as Crimecall.

Presenters 
The show has had many presenters over the years including:

Crimeline (1992–2003)
Marian Finucane (–2000)
David Harvey
Anne Doyle (2001–2003)

Crimecall (2004–present)

Brenda Power (2004–2006)
Dáithí Ó Sé (2004–2005)
Anne Cassin (2006–2011)
Con Murphy (2006–2011)
Grainne Seoige (2011–16)
Philip Boucher Hayes (2011–2016)
Keelin Shanley (2016–2017)
Sharon Ni Bheolan (2018–present)

References

External links
 List of all Crimecall episodes on Garda.ie
Crimecall at RTÉ Television

1964 Irish television series debuts
1960s Irish television series
1970s Irish television series
1980s Irish television series
1990s Irish television series
2000s Irish television series
2010s Irish television series
COCO Television
Irish crime television series
RTÉ original programming
Law enforcement in Ireland
Irish television series based on non-Irish television series